Kudumbimalai known in sinhala as Thoppigala (Thoppigala) is a region in the west of Batticaloa District, Sri Lanka. It consists of a rock formation and a thick jungle. The area is very close to Polonnaruwa District border.

Kudumbimalai in Tamil translates to Hair-knot-rock. British colonists from the past named the rock Baron's Cap.

Thoppigala was under the control of the Liberation Tigers of Tamil Eelam and was strategically important to the organization. In 2007, the Sri Lankan army captured the town from the LTTE in the Battle of Thoppigala, and permanently evicted the LTTE from the Eastern Province.

References 

Towns in Batticaloa District
Koralaipattu South DS Division